Seaford is a township in Nassau County, on the South Shore of Long Island, in New York, United States. The population was 15,294 at the 2010 census.

Geography

History
The original settlers of Seaford were the Marsapeaques, a Native American Indian tribe. They called the area "Great Water Land."

European settlement began with the arrival of Captain John Seaman, a native of Seaford, East Sussex, in England.  After obtaining the patent for the area, Seaman oversaw the creation of Jerusalem South, the first European name given to the town which was to become Seaford.  It was also widely referred to as Seaman's Neck.

During the 19th century, as villages across Long Island started to grow (due to the creation of the Long Island Rail Road), the town of Jerusalem South seemed to be unaffected. In 1868 the town was renamed to the current name of "Seaford", to honor Captain Seaman's hometown in England. During this time, Seaford remained an agriculturally developed area. Over time, the town gained a post office, a church, and a one-room school, established in what would many years later become the first fire house and today serves as the home of the Seaford Historical Museum. Although the town itself was practically unchanged, many New York City residents had discovered that the area was attractive as a summer retreat.

With the creation of Sunrise Highway in 1929, Seaford started to see a large influx of inhabitants. Before 1929, Seaford had approximately 1,200 citizens. Within 25 years,  this number would triple.

The Powell Hotel was torn down in 1977 to make room for the Long Island Savings Bank. Missing historical documents that would have saved the building by proving landmark status were said to only have been discovered in an eave during actual demolition.

Economy

Cash crops such as corn and wheat were some of the earliest farmed within the Seaford area. Due to easy access to various waterfronts, the attempts to fish and recover oysters were widely seen. At first, this was a hard task considering the layers of land beneath the water. In the mid-19th century, baymen from the Seaford area created a type of small, round-bottomed boat called the "Seaford skiff" that was used for fishing and market gunning (commercial waterfowl hunting).

With the popularity of hunting and fishing came the development of two hotels along Merrick Road: the Sportsman's Hotel, where Verity Moving is now located along new Route 135, and the Powell Hotel at Jackson Avenue. Many celebrities came to these hotels to go duck hunting in South Oyster Bay, including New York Yankees Babe Ruth and Lou Gehrig, as well as brewery and longtime Yankees owner Jacob Ruppert. Local guides, including Nelson Verity and Sheriff Garner Paine (one of Long Island's first black officials), would take them to the bay for sport.

Demographics

As of the census of 2000, there were 15,791 people, 5,257 households, and 4,200 families residing in the CDP. The population density was 6,072.9 per square mile (2,345.0/km2). There were 5,358 housing units at an average density of 2,060.6/sq mi (795.7/km2). The racial makeup of the CDP was 99.8% white, .15% African American, .06% Native American, .68% Asian, .02% Pacific Islander, .54% from other races, and .59% from two or more races. Hispanic or Latino people of any race were 1.71% of the population.

There were 5,257 households, out of which 37.2% had children under the age of 18 living with them, 68.4% were married couples living together, 8.6% had a female householder with no husband present, and 20.1% were non-families. 16.3% of all households were made up of individuals, and 8.3% had someone living alone who was 65 years of age or older. The average household size was 3.00 and the average family size was 3.38.

In the CDP, the population was spread out, with 25.2% under the age of 18, 6.9% from 18 to 24, 30.2% from 25 to 44, 23.9% from 45 to 64, and 13.7% who were 65 years of age or older. The median age was 38 years. For every 100 females, there were 95.5 males. For every 100 females age 18 and older, there were 93 males.

The median income for a household in the CDP was $78,572, and the median income for a family was $85,751. Males had a median income of $60,092 versus $39,083 for females. The per capita income for the CDP was $29,244. About 2.8% of families and 3.6% of the population were below the poverty line, including 2.9% of those under age 18 and 3.9% of those age 65 or over.

Education
The Seaford Union Free School District is the public school district that encompasses the Seaford Harbor Elementary School (K-5), Seaford Manor Elementary School (K-5), Seaford Middle School (6-8), and Seaford High School (9–12). The town of Seaford is home to two private schools, Saint William the Abbot Catholic School  (Nursery-8) led by Principal Elizabeth Bricker, and Maria Regina School.

The Seaford Free Union School District contains a Board of Education and a Central Administration that oversee the entire school district and are charged with decision making. The board is headed by President Bruce A. Kahn, and Vice President Brian W. Fagan. The Central Administration deals with education matters and budgeting. Its members are Superintendent Brian Conboy, Assistant Superintendent John Strifalino, Assistant Superintendent of Business Elissa Pelati, Directory of Technology Ted Kaden, and Director of Special Education Jane Dawkins.

Seaford High School's subjects  include art, business, computer sciences, English, health, French, Spanish, American Sign Language, mathematics, music & choral studies, physical education & health, science, and social studies. Within most of these subjects, AP courses are available.

As of 2010, there were 3,296 students attending all public schools in Seaford, and 984 in private schools.

 The school has a total enrollment of 786 students and is equipped with 62 full-time teachers, for a generally low teacher to student ratio of 13:1. The current principal of Seaford High School is Scott Bersin. Vice principals are Anthony Alison and Jessica Sventeroitis.

The Seaford Free Union School District currently holds no rankings, but bolsters a graduation rate of 96%/  56% of students in the school district take AP courses.

Within the Seaford Public School District, essential parts of the school and town's identity are its sports and extracurricular activities. The Manor and Harbor Elementary Schools do not offer school-affiliated sports, but do have some clubs and an after-school SCOPE program for students. Seaford Middle School offers many school-sponsored sports, including wrestling, volleyball, softball, baseball, lacrosse, and basketball. The middle school also offers a drama program that produces a musical once a year for the community. Seaford High School offers many of the same sports as middle school, but at the varsity and junior varsity levels. The high school offers clubs such as Students Against Destructive Decisions and Gay Straight Alliance.

The Seaford Public Library is located at 2234 Jackson Avenue.

Seaford Public Library 
The Seaford Public Library is run by a board of trustees that oversees how the library is interacting with the community. The board is headed by President John Scaparro, and Vice President Mary Westermann. It is the goal of the Seaford Public Library to provide factual information and opportunities for cultural enrichment to the residents of the Seaford School District. 

The library requires a membership to be able to use the library's resources. Membership is free and valid for up to three years. Members can take out books any day of the week except for Sunday. The library also has movies, documentaries, and magazines available for borrowing. 

In addition, the library creates many events for both adults and children. Events for children include crafts, scavenger hunts, and book clubs. One event that takes place in the library is reading to dogs. The library is able to bring in reading/therapy dogs for the kids to read to them. Another program of the library is to rent out items to the children. The library has a Telescope Program that allows members to borrow a telescope from the library for a week and then return it. The adults have opportunities to be a part of book discussions over Zoom.  

The Seaford Public Library is an in-person experience and can be used as a resource from home. The library has an online website that can be accessed from anywhere. Many online resources include the Newsletter, event calendar, and even databases for research.  

Being a part of the Seaford Library comes with many benefits. In addition, to the books, events, and online website the library is also a terrific way to get free passes to many amazing experiences. These opportunities included passes to the Intrepid, Long Island Children’s Museum, etc.

Cedar Creek Park
The Cedar Creek Park, located on the south end of Seaford on Merrick Road, east of Wantagh Avenue, contains playgrounds, dunes and athletic fields, and offers a variety of community-based activities.

During several months following Hurricane Sandy (October 2012), Cedar Creek Park was the site of a relief and assistance center, providing services of the American Red Cross and the Federal Emergency Management Agency, and a central location for property insurance companies to advise customers regarding the filing of claims for property damage.

Sports
Seaford has Police Athletic Leagues for several sports, and the local Roman Catholic parish, St. William the Abbott, offers Catholic Youth Organization (CYO) baseball, basketball, swimming, and volleyball. Maria Regina also offers a wide variety of CYO sports. Seaford is also home to the Long Island Broncos, Seaford Little League for baseball and softball. Established in 1966, the Long Island Broncos is one of the oldest Youth Football and Cheer organizations on Long Island.

Transportation 
Seaford has a station on the Babylon Branch of the Long Island Rail Road.

Nassau Inter-County Express service in Seaford is provided by the n54 (which serves the train station) and the n19 (which runs along Merrick Road, south of the station).

Notable people 
 Liberty DeVitto, best known as the drummer for Billy Joel; has also played with the NYC Hit Squad
 Courtney Henggeler, actress, Cobra Kai

Al Iaquinta, real-estate agent and UFC fighter
 Jesse Kinch, singer, songwriter, musician
 Peter T. King, representative for New York's 2nd Congressional District
 Matthew Koma, singer, songwriter, musician
 Sean Nolin, Washington Nationals pitcher
 Eric Tuchman, Emmy Award-winning producer and screenwriter, The Handmaid's Tale
 Jim Valvano, head men's basketball coach at North Carolina State University, winners of the 1983 NCAA tournament

References

External links
 

 Seaford community website
 Seaford Union Free School District

Census-designated places in New York (state)
Census-designated places in Nassau County, New York
Hempstead, New York
Oyster Bay (town), New York
Populated coastal places in New York (state)